Taringa! is an Argentine-based social networking site geared toward Hispanophone users.

Taringa! consists of a 27 million registered user base, according with Taringa's own metrics who create and share thousands of daily posts on general interest topics such as: life hacks, tutorials, recipes, reviews, and art.

The platform has a presence in every country in the Spanish-speaking world – its main markets are Argentina, Spain, Colombia and Chile.  According to comScore statistics in 2013, it was the fourth most popular Latin American Social Network and the second one in traffic only after Facebook, since then the site's traffic has dramatically declined, dropping up to the 3898th place in the Alexa Ranking on December 30, 2020.

In February 2012, an article by Wired listed Taringa! as one of the foreign sites that "outshine Facebook", stating "there are still places where an also-ran or a homegrown alternative beats out the global hegemonies".

In September 2017, Taringa! suffered a database breach when almost 28 million database entries were leaked.

Structure

Posts
One of Taringa!'s most important aspects is the posts. The users create the content themselves and receive feedback from the community (except new users, being experts or not) in the form of comments, points, recommendations, and favorites. Top-rated content gets featured on a special section of the site called Tops. Posts can be about many different subjects. They can be created with text, images, gifs, videos, and/or links. Within the post section of the website there are a variety of categories, including art, travel, news, computers and technology, etc.

Home Page

Historically, Taringa's homepage had a main section of posts which were organized in chronological order, according to the most recent posts, as well secondary sections with Top Posts (the most voted by the community by week, month or year) and Post Highlights (selected using a number of different variables such as visits, comments, favorites, etc.).

In June 2014, Taringa! updated its homepage, making not only aesthetic changes but also by developing a new algorithm in order to highlight the best contributions made by the community. By the use of geo-tracking, each country can have its own personalized homepage, according to the most relevant local issues going on at the time.
Currently, posts created by users can be seen on the homepage and are ordered in three main sections: biggest highlights, emerging, or the most recent:
 Highlights: posts which continue to be the most commented on, most read, most recommended and which maintain the highest score, over an extended period of time (by week).
Emerging: posts that have started to gain momentum; they have received a lot of points, visits, comments or recommendations by the community in just a short period of time. These are subjects that start to become “hot-topics” on the website.
 Most Recent: Posts in chronological order of their creation continue to remain on the homepage but maintain relative prominence.

Communities

Taringa! has a system of user-created groups that are called "Communities." Communities are the space on Taringa! where users can interact and discourse with other users. There are many different categories within Communities, and within each category are a variety of subcategories. These groups are used to share interests, information, ideas, creative content, and others. When you create a Community, you are the owner and the moderator of that Community.  There are more than 80.000 communities created by users in very different kinds of subjects, from Android followers to guitar player community.

My Taringa!
This section of the site was released with Taringa! v5. In this section users can post quick messages, images, videos, and links. These messages are called "shouts". A user can view all of the shouts and activity from all the users he/she follows in My Taringa!

User ranks
In the Taringa! V5, the owners released a function called “Karma”. This is what determines your user rank. 
 Troll: karma −1
 Flamer: karma 0
 Inexperto (Untrained): karma 1
 Iniciado (Beginner): karma 2
 Aprendiz (Novice): karma 3
 Amateur: karma 4
 Regular (Medium): karma 5
 Experto (Expert): karma 6
 Avanzado (Advanced): karma 7
 Elite: karma 8
 Silver: karma 9
 Gold: karma 10
 Platinum: karma 11
 Diamond: karma 12

Internet regulation problems

Legal issues 
According to the protocol of Taringa!, users are only allowed to post links to own-created contents or other contents that don't infringe copyright laws. For example, scanned photographs that are already in the public domain, a linux tutorial, or articles written by themselves. When there are links that infringe copyright laws, they should be removed by the administrators and moderators of the page as it states in Taringa!'s protocol,

The owners of Taringa! alleged that the website worked as an interchange site, so it did not host any file, but at the same time users sometimes posted links that violated copyright. There were also posts with content that had been extracted from other websites or personal blogs, although Taringa! required that every post mentioned its sources. Moreover, the owners remarked that Taringa! only showed links and anyone could search specific contents like music or software, in the same way that those links could be searched on Google or Yahoo.

In May 2011, the owners of Taringa (Brothers Hernán and Matías Botbol) were accused of assistance to copyright infringement and sentenced to pay $200,000 (US$20,000). The Botbol brothers were also prosecuted for infringing article 72 of the 11.723 Law, which regulates copyright activities in Argentina. This article says that "any person who edits, sells or publishes a copyrighted work without permission from its authors will be sentenced to spend a period of one month to six years in jail".

The Botbol brothers were summoned to delete the posts related with copyrighted material. If those posts were not deleted, they could be arrested. The owners of Taringa! alleged that they cannot determine if the material uploaded by users was breaking copyright rules, due to Taringa! has an average of 20,000 posts a day. They also manifested that they were not able to access to Intellectual Property Office ("Registro Nacional de la Propiedad Intelectual" in Argentina) to know which works are under protection of copyright rules.

In addition, the accused said that on March 23, 2009 the controversial material had been deleted from the website, but "other user uploaded it again on June 19, 2009".

Nevertheless, the court considered that the owners of Taringa! were conscious about the infringements committed and in spite of deleting illegal content, they allowed forbidden material to remain on the website without being removed.

In October, 2011, The National Court of Appeals (Cámara Nacional de Apelaciones en lo Criminal y Correccional) also prosecuted Alberto Nakayama finding him responsible for publishing links that allowed users to download books without permission from their authors. The court also unveiled three precedent rulings that seized Nakayama's assets for $100,000, $200,000 and $300,000 respectively.

The court, formed by Judges Marcelo Lucini and Mario Filozof, described that the prosecuted, as owners of Wiroo S.R.L., subscribed the hosting services of Taringa! (www.taringa.net) offering users "the possibility of sharing and downloading material with no permission from the authors for its publication on the website. Therefore, they helped users to spread the illegal reproduction of the material published".

On the other side, Taringa! published on its website the same note that had been posted in May, 2011, when the prosecuting of Botbol Brothers was confirmed. Once again the owners of Taringa! stated they had not commit any offense. They alleged that the works which they were demanded for "were not hosted on Taringa!, but in Rapidshare, whose servers are located outside Argentina. So the Argentine law should not apply to this issue".

The resolution stated that Nakayama "is the owner (along Matías and Hernán Botbol) of the site www.taringa.net, and all of them allowed material which reproduction had not been authorized by authors to be published on the webpage, although the publications redirected to other Internet site, it could not have been possible unless it was done through Taringa".

"It was demonstrated that works were illegally reproduced uploading them to a webpage without being authorized by their creators", said the ruling.

In January 2012 Taringa! was included by the FBI as one of the websites investigated for copyright infringement and other cybercrimes, as stated in a written report that was part of the prosecution against Megaupload.

In May, 2012, it was announced that the owners of Taringa! (Matías and Hernán Botbol and Alberto Nakayama) will be judged under the charge of infringing copyright law in Argentina. They had been prosecuted for allowing the download of copyrighted legal and computer books through Taringa! website. Article 72 of Argentine copyright Law (which the owners of Taringa! are accused to infringe) punishes with imprisonment from a minimum of one month to a maximum of six years. The trial was finally confirmed in September 2012, being the first time that the responsibility of websites for the illegal downloads made by their users will be discussed through oral proceedings in Argentina.

On October 4, 2012, by deciding to drop the appeal, the site Administrators forced the Federal VI Appealing Chamber to give the handling the case back to First Instance so that this would order Court N° 26.17 to proceed with the trial.

Taringa's approach and solution 
In December 2012, the website announced an upgraded system to report content susceptible to copyright infringement. Taringa! uses the "notice and takedown" method which is based on a North American model of Intellectual Property management on the internet, known as Digital Millennium Copyright Act (DMCA). Those procedures were made with the purpose of reaching an agreement with the "Cámara Argentina del Libro" (CAL), the body that regulates books copyright in Argentina.

Finally, in 2013, after having established channels of communication with the owners of Taringa!, the main plaintiffs in the case decided to desist from continuing the lawsuit. In April that same year, Taringa! signed an agreement with some leading intellectual property organizations to make a joint effort to "democratise the circulation of culture commodities online."... "The agreement with Taringa "opened a new phase of development as far as copyright laws are concerned" as it was said after the meeting.

Other cases 
In May 2015, Taringa! was dismissed from a complaint presented by Jorge Luis Borges's widow, María Kodama, the widow and sole heir of the rights of writer Jorge Luis Borges, for the alleged theft of intellectual property. The ruling established that internet companies cannot be held liable a priori for content shared by users across platforms and that there was no malicious intentions on the part of Taringa!

Throughout April 2014, Kodama reported various websites which allegedly facilitated or reproduced unauthorized texts by Jorge Luis Borges on the internet. Finally, the justice made its settlement in line with the jurisprudence of recent cases in Argentina – p.e "Belén Rodriguez and Google" – making the responsibility of internet intermediaries a subjective one.

According to this position, internet intermediary companies can only be considered accountable for any illegal content uploaded by users through their platforms once they are duly notified by the affected owner of a breach of law, and only if, once notified they do not proceed quickly and diligently in order to remove the content and stop infringement.

Social impact
In 2010, an Argentine user of the site built a bass guitar that he could gift to Paul McCartney when he visited Argentina for a series of concerts.

In 2012 Taringa! launched "T! Solidaridad", a branch of Taringa! dedicated to community service and corporate responsibility. Taringa! users promote charitable causes by raising awareness about donating and volunteering. Users can take action by posting in the category called "Solidaridad", which allows users to post requests and proposals for social action that will help people and animals in need. T! Solidaridad also contributes to these causes by collecting items for the homeless and children's organizations, as well as organizing blood drives and animal shelters.

Taringa! also published a book in July 2009. This consisted of a compilation of the most valued posts (according to the opinion of users) in the history of the site. The income derived from the book sales were donated to NGO "Un Techo para mi País" ("A Home for my Country").

Security
The site suffered a major security breach and according to an official report, the data of 28 million users was leaked.

"On the day we suffered an external attack that compromised the security of our databases and the Taringa! Code," the social network reported in a post. "No phone numbers or access credentials of other social networks have been compromised, as well as addresses of bitcoin wallets from the Taringa! Creators program. But we forced a password reset for all potentially affected users," the statement continued.

References

External links
 Official website

Argentine social networking websites
Argentine news websites
Internet properties established in 2004
2004 establishments in Argentina
Spanish-language websites